Leoncio Estrella (born February 20, 1975) is a Dominican former Major League Baseball pitcher who played for the Toronto Blue Jays, Milwaukee Brewers, and San Francisco Giants.

External links

1975 births
Living people
Atlantic City Surf players
Capital City Bombers players
Chattanooga Lookouts players
Dominican Republic expatriate baseball players in Canada
Dominican Republic expatriate baseball players in Mexico
Dominican Republic expatriate baseball players in the United States
Dunedin Blue Jays players
Fresno Grizzlies players
Hagerstown Suns players
Indianapolis Indians players
Iowa Cubs players
Kingsport Mets players

Louisville RiverBats players
Major League Baseball players from the Dominican Republic
Major League Baseball pitchers
Mexican League baseball pitchers
Milwaukee Brewers players
New Haven Ravens players
Norfolk Tides players
People from Puerto Plata, Dominican Republic
Pittsfield Mets players
Rojos del Águila de Veracruz players
San Francisco Giants players
Syracuse SkyChiefs players
Tennessee Smokies players
Toronto Blue Jays players
Vaqueros Laguna players
West Tennessee Diamond Jaxx players